Dieterich is a village in Effingham County, Illinois, United States. The population was 890 at the 2020 census. Dieterich is part of the Effingham, IL Micropolitan Statistical Area.

History
Dieterich was laid out in 1880 when the railroad was extended to that point. The village was named for its founder, Michael Dieterich. A post office has been in operation at Dieterich since 1881.

Geography
Dieterich is located in eastern Effingham County at  (39.060156, -88.378994). Illinois Route 33 passes through the village, leading northwest  to Effingham and southeast  to Newton.

Demographics

As of the census of 2000, there were 591 people, 218 households, and 168 families residing in the village. The racial makeup of the village was 99.32% White, 0.17% Asian, 0.34% from other races, and 0.17% from two or more races. Hispanic or Latino of any race were 0.34% of the population.

There were 218 households, out of which 39.4% had children under the age of 18 living with them, 61.5% were married couples living together, 11.5% had a female householder with no husband present, and 22.5% were non-families. 20.2% of all households were made up of individuals, and 8.3% had someone living alone who was 65 years of age or older.  The average household size was 2.71 and the average family size was 3.11.

In the village, the population was spread out, with 29.4% under the age of 18, 8.5% from 18 to 24, 29.6% from 25 to 44, 20.8% from 45 to 64, and 11.7% who were 65 years of age or older.  The median age was 34 years. For every 100 females, there were 92.5 males.  For every 100 females age 18 and over, there were 87.0 males.

The median income for a household in the village was $45,972, and the median income for a family was $48,000. Males had a median income of $30,865 versus $21,250 for females. The per capita income for the village was $16,652.  About 7.9% of families and 7.5% of the population were below the poverty line, including 11.0% of those under age 18 and 5.6% of those age 65 or over.

References

External links
Village of Dieterich official website

Villages in Effingham County, Illinois
Villages in Illinois